Tafsir Rahnama is a contemporary 20 volume exegesis on Qur'an in Persian. So far 17 volumes of this work have been published. The book is based on Akbar Hashemi Rafsanjani's studies on Qur'an.

Background

Hashemi spent 3 years in jail from 1976 until the Iranian revolution in 1979 in Evin Jail. During this time, he finished 22 notebooks (each 200 pages) on what he understood from Qur'an. These notes consisted of 30,000 possible interpretations from Qur'anic verses. Later after the revolution, for the sole purpose of accomplishing this project, a center titled "Quranic culture and science" (Markaz-e-Farhang va Maaref-e-Qur'an) was established in which researchers could develop the commentary. The researchers in a group of 5 investigated each interpretation and approved them in a group of 3. The first volume was published in 1992.

Structure
The book is structured is as follows:

 The book does not follow a traditionalist (narrative; based on hadith) method, but it uses narrations that help clarify the meaning.
 It relies principally on the literal meaning of the verses. 
 It uses the relation of different phrases with each other.
 The occasion where the verses were revealed was used to help understand the passage better.

Tafsir Rahnama categorizes different subjects covered in Qur'an so the reader can choose his subject of interest.

See also
Qur'an
Qur'anic exegesis (Tafsir)
List of tafsir works

References

Shia tafsir
Books by Akbar Hashemi Rafsanjani